The UNESCO World Network of Biosphere Reserves (WNBR) covers internationally designated protected areas, known as biosphere reserves, which are meant to demonstrate a balanced relationship between people and nature (e.g. encourage sustainable development). They are created under the Man and the Biosphere Programme (MAB).

Mission
The World Network of Biosphere Reserves (WNBR) of the MAB Programme consists of a dynamic and interactive network of sites. It works to foster the harmonious integration of people and nature for sustainable development through participatory dialogue, knowledge sharing, poverty reduction, human well-being improvements, respect for cultural values and by improving society's ability to cope with climate change. It promotes north–south and South-South collaboration and represents a unique tool for international cooperation through the exchange of experiences and know-how, capacity-building and the promotion of best practices.

The network

 total membership had reached 738 biosphere reserves in 134 countries (including 22 transboundary sites) occurring in all regions of the world. Myanmar had its first biosphere reserve inscribed in 2015. This already takes into account some biosphere reserves that have been withdrawn or revised through the years, as the program's focus has shifted from simple protection of nature to areas displaying close interaction between man and environment.

Criteria and periodic review process
Article 4 of the  defines general criteria for an area to be qualified for designation as a biosphere reserve as follows: 
  It should encompass a mosaic of ecological systems representative of major biogeographic regions, including a gradation of human interventions.
  It should be of significance for biological diversity conservation.
  It should provide an opportunity to explore and demonstrate approaches to sustainable development on a regional scale.
  It should have an appropriate size to serve the three functions of biosphere reserves — conservation, development, logistic support.
  It should include these functions through appropriate zonation, recognizing core, buffer, and outer transition areas.
  Organizational arrangements should be provided for the involvement and participation of a suitable range of inter alia public authorities, local communities and private interests in the design and carrying out the functions of a biosphere reserve.
  In addition, provisions should be made for:
          mechanisms to manage human use and activities in the buffer zone or zones;
      a management policy or plan for the area as a biosphere reserve;
      a designated authority or mechanism to implement this policy or plan;
      programmes for research, monitoring, education and training.
    
  

Article 9 of the Statutory Framework states that "the status of each biosphere reserve should be subject to a periodic review every ten years, based on a report prepared by the concerned authority, on the basis of the criteria of Article 4". If a biosphere reserve no longer satisfies the criteria contained in Article 4, it may be recommended the state concerned take measures to ensure conformity. Should a biosphere reserve still does not satisfy the criteria contained in Article 4, within a reasonable period, the area will no longer be referred to as a biosphere reserve which is part of the network.

Withdrawals 
Article 9 of the Statutory Framework gives a state the right to remove a biosphere reserve under its jurisdiction from the network.
, a total of 45 sites had been withdrawn from the World Network of Biosphere Reserves by 9 countries.
Some reserves have been withdrawn after they no longer met newer, stricter criteria for reserves, for example on zonation or area size.

In June 2017, during the International Coordinating Council of the Man and the Biosphere Programme (MAB ICC) meeting in Paris, the United States has withdrawn 17 sites (out of the country's previous total of 47 sites) from the program.

References

External links

 

1977 in the environment
+
Biodiversity
Biomes